Aadmi may refer to:

 Aadmi (1939 film)
 Aadmi (1968 film), a 1968 Hindi drama film
 Aadmi (1993 film), a 1993 Hindi-language Indian film directed by Arshad Khan